Made In Thailand (MIT, เมดอินไทยแลนด์) was the fifth album by Thai rock band Carabao.  Released in December 1984, this is their most popular album having sold over five million copies. The titular song was used in the 1985 Sompote Sands film Magic Lizard.

Bua Looi, the fifth part in the Thyk Kwai tui series, which can be considered one of the band's signature songs. It was also opened in the women's volleyball tournament at the 2020 Tokyo Summer Olympics between South Korea vs Turkey in quarter-finals round.

Track listing

References

1984 albums
Carabao (band) albums